Andy Murray was the defending champion, but chose not to participate this year.

João Sousa won the title, defeating Roberto Bautista Agut in the final in three sets, 3–6, 6–3, 6–4.

Seeds
The top four seeds received a bye into the second round.

Draw

Finals

Top half

Bottom half

Qualifying

Seeds

Qualifiers

Lucky losers

Qualifying draw

First qualifier

Second qualifier

Third qualifier

Fourth qualifier

External links
 Main draw
 Qualifying draw

2015 ATP World Tour